Heep Yunn School (Chinese 協恩中學) is an Anglican girls' secondary school founded in 1936, commonly known simply as HYS. It is located in Ma Tau Wai, Kowloon, Hong Kong. The School commenced operation in the DSS (Direct Subsidy Scheme) mode starting from junior forms in September 2012. It is governed by the Council of Heep Yunn School, also the sponsoring body of the primary and kindergarten sections.

History
Heep Yunn School used to be a Sheng Kung Hui grant-in-aid school for girls before it turned to the DSS mode in September 2012. It was established when two schools founded by the Church Missionary Society - the Fairlea School (1886) and the Victoria Home and Orphanage (1887) were merged in 1936 at the present site in Farm Road. This accounts for the name "Heep Yunn" - meaning the union of the two schools through the grace of God. Two buildings of the campus of Heep Yunn School are listed as Grade III historic buildings by Hong Kong's Antiquities and Monuments Office: The Main Building and St. Clare Chapel.

House
The five houses are named after the school name.

Extracurricular activities
The school offers over 20 school sports teams, four choirs, three orchestras, debating teams in both Chinese, Mandarin and English, an active drama group and team and over 60 other co-curricular programmes relating to languages, humanity studies, visual art, science, dance, community services and leadership training. Participating in these groups enhances students' interpersonal skills, problem-solving skills, responsibility, and innovation. The school holds a student-led fun fair every year on the third Sunday of January, where students build stalls from scratch and design games for the public to raise funds.

Inter-school sports 

There are twenty-one sports teams in HYS.

Inter-school competition results (2018–2019):

Notable alumnae

 Rebecca Chan Chung - Decorated U.S. World War II veteran who served as a Nurse with the Flying Tigers (China), the U.S. Army (China) and the China National Aviation Corporation (China and India), with work including flying over the Hump (1942-1948); the first Head (Sister-Tutor-in-Charge) of the Nursing School of the Tung Wah Group of Hospitals, Hong Kong, 1964-1975; 1923 student of Fairlea Girls’ School (a forerunner of Heep Yunn School)
 Stephanie Ho - TVB actress and singer
 Charmaine Sheh - Second runner-up in the 1997 Miss Hong Kong Pageant, TVB actress
 Sheren Tang - Hong Kong actress, 2010 TVB Anniversary Award - Best Actress (No Regrets)
 Elaine Chan (swimmer) - Two-time Olympic swimmer from Hong Kong, specialized in freestyle events
 Ellen Cheung - Pen name Xi Xi, Hong Kong writer

See also
Education in Hong Kong
List of secondary schools in Hong Kong

References

External links

Official Website of Heep Yunn School,Kowloon,Hong Kong
Alumni: Heep Yunn Old Girls' Association
Heep Yunn School Video Clips

Protestant secondary schools in Hong Kong
Girls' schools in Hong Kong
Anglican schools in Hong Kong
Ma Tau Wai
Grade III historic buildings in Hong Kong